Carabus vladsimirskyi is a species of ground beetle in the family Carabidae. It is found in China, Russia, and Mongolia.

Subspecies
These three subspecies belong to the species Carabus vladsimirskyi:
 Carabus vladsimirskyi pachypterus Imura, 1999  (China, Mongolia, and Russia)
 Carabus vladsimirskyi tianzhuiensis Cavazzuti, 2008  (China)
 Carabus vladsimirskyi vladsimirskyi Dejean, 1830  (China, Mongolia, and Russia)

References

vladsimirskyi
Insects described in 1830